HMS Montrose has been the name of two ships of the United Kingdom's Royal Navy:
 , a Scott-class (or Admiralty-type) destroyer leader that served throughout World War II and was scrapped in 1946.
 , a Type 23 frigate launched in 1992 and currently in service.

Although there have only been two operational vessels of the Royal Navy named Montrose, traditionally the tender attached to the Tay Division of the Royal Naval Reserve in Dundee was renamed as HMS Montrose in honour of the 6th duke, who was instrumental in the original formation of the Royal Naval Volunteer Reserve in 1903.

Battle honours
Atlantic 1939–40
Dunkirk 1940
Arctic 1942–43
North Sea 1942–44
English Channel 1943–44
Normandy 1944

References

Royal Navy ship names